Route nationale 15  (RN15) is a secondary, unpaved highway in Madagascar. The route runs from Beroroha to Sakaraha where it makes junction with the (National Road 7).  It covers a distance of 232 km and is hardly practicable.

Selected locations on route (from north to south)
Beroroha
Ankazoabo 
Sakaraha - (National Road 7)

See also

References 

Roads in Madagascar